Lily F Bardsley (born 7 August 1995) is an Australian cricketer. She is a wicket-keeper and right-handed batter. During 2015/16–2016/17, Bardsley played seven List A matches for the Australian Capital Territory in the Women's National Cricket League (WNCL) and seven T20 matches for the Melbourne Stars in the Women's Big Bash League (WBBL).

References

External links
 
 

1995 births
Living people
Australian cricketers
Australian women cricketers
ACT Meteors cricketers
Cricketers from Newcastle, New South Wales
Melbourne Stars (WBBL) cricketers
Sportswomen from New South Wales
Wicket-keepers